The Challenge XXX: Dirty 30 (often promoted as The Challenge XXX) is the thirtieth season of the MTV reality competition series, The Challenge. It was filmed in Colombia during May and June 2017, with alumni from The Real World, Road Rules, The Challenge, and Are You the One? competing. Jonathan Murray, Gil Goldschein, Scott Freeman, and Fred Birckhead were the executive producers, with Ryan Smith and Danny Wascou serving as co-executive producers.

A launch special aired on July 11, 2017, and the season premiered on July 18, 2017. The season concluded with a two-part reunion special/finale on November 14 and 21, 2017 and behind-the-scenes special of the reunion and the reunion after-party on November 28, 2017. It also marks the first chapter of a Challenge trilogy, followed by Vendettas and Final Reckoning.

Contestants

Format
The cast is composed of contestants who have acted dirty on a past season or show. The main elements of the game are as follows.

Daily Missions: Each round, the players compete in a challenge. The challenges will vary between individual and team challenges. The winners are immune from elimination and nominate one player of each gender for the Elimination Round. The losers players are eligible for the Double Cross. In some challenges, not everyone is eligible for the Double Cross but is still vulnerable to be nominated by the winning team.
Nominations: The winners from the Main Match openly vote to nominate one other player of each gender for the Elimination Round. 
Elimination Rounds (Presidio): At the "Presidio", the "Double Cross" Draw is held. All losing players from the Daily Mission participate in a Random-Draw. The player who draws the Double Cross is safe from elimination and must nominate a fellow losing player of their Gender into the Presidio.The winners remain in the game, while the losers are eliminated. 

In the end, only six players - 3 male and 3 female - compete in the final challenge. Unbeknownst to each contestant, they will compete for a share of $1,000,000 — the largest monetary prize in Challenge history. The winner of each gender winning $450,000, the runners-up winning $35,000 and third place taking home $15,000. 

Twists
Purge Challenges: Some challenges are designated as Purges - sudden death challenges where the losers are immediately eliminated.
 In the opening challenge "The Purge", the players competed in several rounds to guarantee their safety, with 3 players of each gender being eliminated. 
 The "X Marks the Spot" and  "Snaking Your Way Back In" challenges composed the second purge of the game. This purge would narrow down the 10 players, to the final 6 that would face the Final Challenge. 
Vote-Offs: At some points in the game, the winners of the Daily Mission also win the power to vote-off one of the losers.
 In "The Purge", the winners of the final part of the challenge has to vote-off 3 out of the 4 remaining losing players of their gender.
 In "Blackout", the winning team has to vote one male and one female out of the game.
 In "Backstabber", the individual winners vote one male and one female out of the game.
Redemption House: Similar to Ex-ile from Battle of the Exes II, the "Redemption House" gives eliminated players a chance to re-enter the game. Periodically, the players in Redemption House participate in a Redemption Game, with the winners returning to the game, while the losers are officially eliminated.

Gameplay

Challenge games
 The Purge: This challenge is played in three different phases. In the first phase, which is individual, each player must roll barrels up a hill. The top four finishers of each gender are safe from elimination. In the second phase, which is played as two teams, each team must carry a pair of cannons up a hill. The players from the team that win are the next to be safe from elimination. In the third phase, each remaining player must race toward a pile of cannonballs, bring it up a hill and fire with their cannon. The first player of each gender to fire their cannons are the last to be safe from elimination, and choose three players (out of four) of the same gender to be eliminated (and unbeknownst to them or the other players, be sent to Redemption House).
 Round 1 Winners: Aneesa, Bananas, Camila, Derrick K., Hunter, Jordan, Kailah & Tori
 Round 2 Winners: Blue Team (Ammo, Britni, Cara Maria, Dario, Derrick H., Leroy, Marie, Nelson, Nicole & Veronica)
 Round 3 Winners: Cory & Jenna
 Sent to Redemption: Amanda, Devin, Darrell, LaToya, Shane & Simone
 Cool Under Fire: Players will be suspended 30 feet above the water while sitting on a ledge against a wall. Every so often the wall will tilt forward to make it harder to remain on. There are safety ropes along the wall in order to allow players to get into position, but they are not allowed to grab them once the horn has been blown. The challenge is played in two heats of six males and six females per heat. The remaining not playing in the heat may choose to launch rotten tomatoes from stationary slingshots at their opponents. The two male and two female players to last the longest in each heat will be declared the winners. The two males and two females to fall first will be the losers of the challenge and are eligible for The Double Cross. 
 Heat 1 Winners: Cara Maria, Derrick K., Nelson & Nicole
 Heat 2 Winners: Bananas, Camila, CT & Tori
 Battle Royale: Players will be divided into two teams of ten and the challenge will be played in male and female heats. Teams will start from opposing poles in the arena with a narrow hallway in the middle. Once TJ sounds the horn, players must run through the hallway to the opposing team's pole to retrieve five rings hanging from their pole. Upon retrieving these rings, teams must run back to their starting pole and place their opponents rings on them. Each player is responsible for grabbing a ring. The first team to win two heats will win while the losing team will all be eligible for The Double Cross. The two players not selected for a team will be required to sit out from the challenge and will also be eligible for The Double Cross.
 Winners:  Aneesa, CT, Cara Maria, Cory, Dario, Hunter, Leroy, Marie, Tori & Veronica
 Pirates' Treasure: Players will be placed into male-female pairs. The game will be played in two heats and once TJ sounds the horn, pairs must carry a 100 lb chest through a series of obstacles in order to reach the finish line. Once reaching the finish line, players must smash open their chests with a hammer in order to a retrieve a Jolly Roger flag which they must hoist up a flagpole to complete. The first pair to hoist their flag in each heat wins while the bottom two pairs in each heat will be declared the losers and are eligible for The Double Cross.
 Heat 1 Winners: CT & Cara Maria
 Heat 2 Winners: Nelson & Veronica
 Ups And Downs: Players must divide themselves into teams of four with two males and two females on each team. Teams will have to place thirty Challenge logos in chronological order using placards on a tall beam. One player will be in charge of placing the placards in order while the remaining three teammates will be required to hoist them up and down the beam using a rope. The first team to place all of their logos in order will be declared the winners. The two last-place teams will be eligible for The Double Cross.
Winners:  Camila, Cara Maria, CT & Leroy
 Talk Thirty to Me: Players will compete as individuals and will be suspended 30 feet in the air above water. Players will be asked a series of trivia questions related to their cast-mates. If a player gets a question wrong, they will receive an 'X' to their score, but if they answer correctly they will be able to add an 'X' to an opposing player's score. Once a player has three 'X's they will be out of the challenge. The game will be played in a male heat and a female heat. The first four players to hit the water in each heat will be the losers and eligible for The Double Cross, and the last male and female players will be the winners of the challenge. Winners of the challenge will also receive a getaway for themselves and a friend.
Winners: Camila & Tony
 Saved By The Bell: Players will be divided into four teams of four. Teams must go from one platform 30 feet in the air to the other platform across the way hopping across a series of bells. They must do this while another team is competing as well. The team to finish the fastest, or with the most players across, will be declared the winners. All three losing teams will be eligible for The Double Cross. The two players not selected for a team will be required to sit out from the challenge and will also be eligible for The Double Cross.
Winners: Camila, CT, Hunter & Kailah
 Blackout: Players will be placed into three teams of five. Teams will be placed inside a blacked-out 8x8 box where they will be unable to see anything. They must scratch and claw the paint away from their window to unveil numbers that will unlock a combination to a pickaxe. They will need to use the pickaxe to escape the box and then solve a three-dimensional puzzle. The first team to solve the puzzle will win while the two losing teams will be eligible for the Double Cross. The winning team is also able to select one male and one female to send straight to the Redemption House.
Winners: Britni, Jordan, Kailah, Tony & Veronica
 Sent to Redemption: CT & Cara Maria
 Backstabber: Players will be playing 600 feet in the air on the top of a building. Competing as individuals, players must walk across a balance beam going off of a building where there are three 'X's at the end of every beam, representing the other player's beams. The first player to reach their X's may knock whoever they'd like off of a beam. The fastest male and fastest female players to complete the challenge will win while all losing players will be eligible for The Double Cross. The challenge will be played in two heats each for male and female players. The first players knocked off in each heat will also be eligible to be sent straight to the Redemption House by the winners.
Winners: Hunter & Jenna
 Sent to Redemption: Jordan & Veronica
 X Marks the Spot: As part of the first challenge in The Second Purge players will divide themselves into male-female pairs. Once TJ blows the horn, the pairs must compete in a grueling obstacle course that will eventually lead the pairs to puzzle pieces. Once the pairs retrieve their puzzle pieces, they will split off as individuals to complete their puzzles. The first two males and first two females to complete their puzzles will earn their spot in the final challenge while the bottom six players will compete in the next challenge for the last two spots in the final challenge.
Winners: Cara Maria, CT, Jordan & Tori
 Snaking Your Way Back In: As part of the second challenge in The Second Purge players will once again compete as individuals. Players will be hanging from two blue ropes on a structure 30 feet above the water. They must shimmy their way until they reach a yellow rope and must transition onto it. They must then shimmy off the structure and swim to a buoy and wrap their rope around it. The first male and female player to put their rope around their buoy will win and continue on to the final challenge while the losers will be permanently eliminated from the game.
Winners: Camila & Derrick K.
 Eliminated: Hunter, Jenna, Kailah & Tony

Presidio games
Balls to the Wall: Players are placed in separate areas with rods sticking out of the walls attached to metal balls on the end. The male players would compete with ten balls while the female players compete with six balls. The first player to rip out each ball from the wall before their opponent wins.
 Played by: Cory vs. Derrick H., Briana vs. Britni
The Great Escape: Players must climb to the top of a plaster wall using pegs to dig through holes hidden behind marked circles. The player reaches the top of the wall and dumps the trough of mud on their opponent wins.
 Played by: Kailah vs. Jenna, Ammo vs. Tony
Striptease: Players are blindfolded in the middle of the arena. On their opponent are patches placed on various parts of the body. First player to pull off a patch gains a point. Male players play in a best-of-9 rounds formant while females play best-of-5. First male to 5 and first female to 3 wins.
Played by: Jordan vs. Ammo, Marie vs. Tori
Deadweight: Players must climb their respective ladder and ring the bell to win. However, their ankles are attached to weights and must pull them through breakable walls while climbing up. The first player to reach the bell wins.
Played by: Aneesa vs. Kailah, Cory vs. Hunter
Rampage: Players are assigned a color before being tied to each other, back-to-back, similar to "Back Up Off Me" from Cutthroat. Players then have to drag their opponents down their assigned-colored ramp to earn a point. The first player to earn two points wins.
Played by: Nicole vs. Britni, Nelson vs. Hunter
Web of Lies: Players start on the top platform of a 25-foot tower, covered in webs and rope. The first player to break through the webs all the way down, retrieve their flag, climb back up to the top platform, and hook their flag to the pole wins.
Played by: Dario vs. Tony, Veronica vs. Aneesa
Body Check: Players have to run through a wall with the door covered in cellophane, colliding into each other, and pass each other to a pole where they around and go straight through another cellophane door where they'll pass each other again to ring a bell. The first person to ring their bell in two out of three rounds wins.
Played by: Leroy vs. Hunter, Jemmye vs. Camila
The Reel World: Players are placed in front of a giant wheel attached to a length of rope with a ball at the end of it. Players then have to jump on the wheel to reel in the rope so that the ball will go pass a line. The first to reel in their rope and have their ball pass the line wins.
Played by: Camila vs. Britni, Derrick K. vs. Bananas

Redemption games
Man Overboard: Players will start on a swinging platform suspended 20 feet above the water. On TJ's signal they must do whatever it takes to knock their opponent off the platform and into the water. The challenge will be played in one-on-one male and female rounds with two qualifying rounds and one final round. The player of each gender to win the final round will win the challenge and return to the competition. The losing six players will be permanently eliminated from the game.
Winners: Jenna & Tony
Green With Envy: Players must dine on a series of five disgusting dishes. Once they finish a dish, they must race up the El Totumo mud volcano and dive into the mud to retrieve a toltumo that may contain either an emerald or a rock. If they break open their toltumo and receive an emerald then they may place it in front of whichever dish they would like to avoid eating and head back up the volcano. If it is a rock, they must eat another dish in order to continue. The first male and first female players to finish all five of their dishes will return to the game while the losing players will be permanently eliminated.
Winners: Aneesa & Hunter
 The Final Redemption Challenge: Players will poke their heads through holes on a life-sized whack-a-mole board to read a code that provides a combination to a lock that contains puzzle pieces. While they are reading the code, the players still in the competition will whack them on the head with mallets to distract them. The first two male players and first female player to retrieve and complete their puzzle will return to the game while the losers will be permanently eliminated.
 Winners: Cara Maria, CT & Jordan

Final challenge 
For the final challenge, the competition moved to Salta, Argentina, where the players will compete for their share of $1 Million. The players will compete in a series of timed checkpoints full of unpredictable twists and turns. First place players will receive $450,000 each, second will receive $35,000 each, and third will receive $15,000 each. To kick off the final challenge, players were tasked with jumping 20,000 feet out of an airplane. Players would then continue on through the course with the help of video clues from TJ.

 Stage 1: Players must run to the top of the ruins and donate a salt gem. At the top players must wait for the next member of the opposite sex available in order to continue. They must then run back down and donate 30 stones to the apacheta pile in order to stop their time.
 Stage 2: From behind the designated line, pairs must toss their bola onto a pole. After each failed attempt the player must take a shot of fermented llama's milk. Once a pair has hooked their bola their time will be stopped. 
 Dirty Deed #1: The winners from Stage 1 must assign one of the other pairs an extra bola to toss onto their pole.
 Stage 3: The winning pair from the last stage will separate and choose two new partners. The pairs will race to collect puzzle pieces to complete their board. Once the puzzle is completed their time will be stopped.
 The Double Cross: Players will once again compete as individuals and draw from The Double Cross. The player who pulls the double cross may assign a five minute time penalty to the player of their choosing from the same sex.
 Stage 4: Players must each race to find an emblem somewhere in the canyon that will allow them to complete the design of a totem pole. In order to retrieve their emblem they must climb to the top of the canyon using climbing gear. They must also memorize the pattern on a totem pole within the course in order to complete their puzzle. If a player's puzzle is incorrect they must run back to the totem pole before attempting again.
 Stage 5: The winners from the last stage will now separate and choose two new partners. Each pair must run into a smokey structure and feel around until they can discover the word on the wall. Once they believe they know the word they must run outside and write the word on a board. If the pair guesses correctly, their time will be stopped. If they are incorrect they must run back inside before trying again.
 Dirty Deed #2: The winners from Stage 5 will assign one player of the same sex to sleep on the ground all night while the other finalists will enjoy a comfortable bed.
 Stage 6: Players must each put on safety gear and hold onto a sled that is being pulled by a truck for as long as they can and then run to the finish line. If they drop prematurely, they must run the remaining distance. TJ would later reveal that he would not be announcing the winners until the reunion.

 The Challenge XXX: Dirty 30 winners: Jordan & Camila
 Second place: Derrick K. & Cara Maria 
 Third place: CT & Tori

Game summary

Elimination chart

Episode progress

Competition
 The contestant won the final challenge
 The contestant did not win the final challenge
 The contestant won the challenge and was safe from elimination
 The contestant won safety and did not have to participate in the challenge
 The contestant was protected from being eliminated by the challenge winner
 The contestant was not selected for the Presidio
 The contestant participated in the Double-Cross draw, but did not draw the XX card
 The contestant pulled the XX card and voted someone into the Presidio
 The contestant won in the Presidio
 The contestant lost in the Presidio
 The contestant was eliminated at the challenge site
 The contestant was disqualified from the competition due to disciplinary reasons
 The contestant withdrew from the competition

Redemption house

Elimination chart

Redemption progress

Competition
 The contestant won the Redemption competition, and returned to the actual game
 The contestant lost the Redemption match, and was permanently eliminated from the competition
 The contestant withdrew from the competition due to injury/illness
 The contestant was disqualified from the competition due to violent behavior

Voting progress

Types of challenges
Bold indicates team captains

Team selections

Episodes

Reunion special
The two-part reunion special/finale aired on November 14 and 21, 2017, and was hosted by WWE pro wrestler, The Real World: Back to New York alum, and former Challenge champion Mike "The Miz" Mizanin. Host T. J. Lavin and each cast member, for the exceptions of Camila and LaToya, attended at the Capitale in New York. A The Final Dirt special showing behind-the-scenes at the reunion and the reunion's after-party aired on November 28, 2017.

Controversy
After winning the daily challenge on episode 8, cast member Camila Nakagawa overheard Leroy Garrett mentioning a woman to other contestants. An intoxicated Nakagawa angrily assumed he was referring to her; she confronted Garrett and started verbally attacking him, using racial slurs. After the episode aired, Nakagawa posted an apology on her social media. The incident was later discussed on an MTV special that followed called Race in America: An MTV Discussion hosted by Nessa.

In November 2021, after he stopped appearing in the competition series, Garrett spoke about the incident on his social media. Garrett criticised MTV for their handling of the situation, expressing to the network that "[...] someone should have stepped in [...] And the fact that no one did, I felt like MTV, you dropped the ball". The network and the show's production company released a statement in which they apologized to Garrett for not taking action and allowing Nakagawa to remain in the competition after her racist outburst.

Notes

References

External links
 

Dirty 30, The Challenge XXX
2017 American television seasons
Television shows set in Cartagena, Colombia
Television shows set in Argentina
Television shows filmed in Colombia
Television shows filmed in Argentina